Otter Highlands is a group of peaks and ridges extending NW-SE for 17 nautical miles (31 km) from Mount Lowe to Wyeth Heights, located west of Blaiklock Glacier and forming the west end of the Shackleton Range. Surveyed by the Commonwealth Trans-Antarctic Expedition in 1957. Named by the United Kingdom Antarctic Place-Names Committee (UK-APC) in 1972 after the De Havilland Otter aircraft which supported the CTAE.

Ridges of Coats Land
Highlands